The Leonardo da Vinci University, often simply abbreviated as "Unidav" is a private university founded in 2004 in Torrevecchia Teatina, Italy. It was created and promoted by the D'Annunzio University of Chieti–Pescara.

Method of Study
Provides e-learning courses, centers remote throughout the Italy.

Organization

Faculties
Faculty of Education Sciences
Faculty of Law
Faculty of Psychology

See also 
 List of Italian universities
 Torrevecchia Teatina
 Distance education
 D'Annunzio University of Chieti–Pescara

External links
 Leonardo da Vinci University Website (Homepage) (in Italian)

Private universities and colleges in Italy
Educational institutions established in 2004
Distance education institutions based in Italy
2004 establishments in Italy
Universities and colleges in Abruzzo
D'Annunzio University of Chieti–Pescara